North African Americans are Americans with origins in the region of North Africa. This group includes Americans of Algeria, Egypt, Libya, Morocco, and Tunisia.

People from North Africa have been in the United States since the sixteenth century. Some of the early explorers who accompanied the Spanish on their expeditions in the United States were North Africans, a group that also contributed to the settlement of some Spanish colonies of that country. As of 2008, the North African population in the United States exceeds 800,000 people.

North Africans in the U.S. can be of Egyptian, Moroccan, Algerian, Tunisian, and Libyan. Sometimes Canarians are also included in this group, because of the geographical location of the Canary Islands in North Africa, and the partly North African ancestry of their population (the Canarians are generally of predominant European ancestry with some  Berber extract) are also considered North Africans (although politically are Europeans, and linguistically, being Spanish, Hispanics).

History
The first centuries of a North African presence in the U.S. is related to the Spanish colonial period in the Southern part of the present-day United States. Moroccan presence in the United States was rare until the mid-twentieth century. The first North Africa who came to the current United States was probably the Azemmouri or Estevanico’s slave, a Muslim Moroccan pilot boat of Berber origin, who participated in the Pánfilo de Narváez's ill-fated  expedition to colonize Florida and the Gulf Coast in 1527. Only Azemmouri and three of his comrades survived during the eleven-year-long of journey of 5,000 miles from Florida to the West Coast, ending the tour in Texas. In 1534, they crossed the geographic south of the United States until Arizona, being also, later, one of four men who accompanied Marcos de Niza as a guide in search of the fabled Seven Cities of Cibola, preceding Coronado. He was also the first explorer who entered an Indian village.

Later, in 1566, forty years before Jamestown, the Spanish founded the colony of Santa Elena. The colony grew for over twenty years until it was invaded by the British in 1587. Many of the Santa Elena colonists were Moriscos and Jews. Ethnically, many of the Santa Elena colonists were Muslims of Berber origin and Sephardic Jews, recruited by the Portuguese Captain Joao Pardo in the thick Galician mountains of northern Portugal in 1567, i.e. less than a year before the climax of the Inquisition against Muslims. When Santa Elena fell, its inhabitants, including the converted Jews and Muslims, escaped into the mountains of North Carolina. They survived, often marrying Native Americans, and then joining a second group that came to American shores in 1587, the same year that Santa Elena fell.

However, until the second half of the 20th century, most of the North African people who emigrated to the United States came from the Canary Islands which belong to Spain. They came to some of the Spanish colonies south of United States with the objective to found and repopulate regions for Spain. In 1539, Hernando de Soto recruited some expeditionaries in this archipelago to explore La Florida, and in 1569 embarked another group of Canarian farmers (known in the Americas as Isleños) with this destination. During the 18th century, other groups of Canarian people arrived in what is now the United States and established themselves in several southern areas of the country. In 1731 arrived 16 Canarian families to San Antonio, between 1757 and 1780, arrived more of 984 Canarian families to Florida, although they promoted the agriculture of the state, most of the settlers in Florida emigrated to Cuba when Florida was sold to the UK in 1763, well as after being recovered by Spain, was ceded to the United States in 1819. Between 1778 and 1783 emigrated about 2,000 Canarians to Louisiana. Thus, more than 3,000 Canarians emigrated to the Spanish colonies in North America during the 18th century. However they are Spanish subjects.

A small community of Moroccan expatriates existed in post-independence South Carolina (then referred to as "Moors," cf. the Moors Sundry Act of 1790).

Continental North Africans have emigrated to the United States in significant numbers only since the 1960s. Until this time, very few continental North Africans arrived in the United States, numbering less than 100 people in the first half of the 19th century. Many of the North African emigrants during the first half of the 20th century were Jews. Many Moroccans, Algerians and Tunisians began to arrive significantly in the 1970s. Sudanese did not start arriving in significant numbers until the 1980s, mostly to escape the civil war in their country.

Most North Africans emigrate due to economic, religious, educational, or political reasons.

Demography
North Africans in the United States include Moroccan, Algerian, Tunisian, and Libyan immigrants to the United States. The largest such communities live in New Jersey, New York, California, Washington, D.C. and Texas. In California, most North Africans live in around from Los Angeles, San Francisco and San Diego. In Texas, the communities are mainly in Dallas, Austin and Houston. There are also concentrated North African settlements in Michigan (especially in Detroit), Nebraska (Omaha), Florida (in cities such as Miami, Orlando or Jacksonville), Illinois (Chicago) and Virginia (in cities such as  Alexandria). There are Isleño communities in Texas, Louisiana and in Florida. While in Texas and Louisiana, most of the Isleños are descended from Canarian settlers; in Florida are recent immigrants and their descendants.

The ancestries of North Africans in the United States are the following:

 Egyptian Americans: 256,070 (2016 American Community Survey) 
 Moroccan Americans: 29,461 (2016 American Community Survey)
 Canarian Americans: 45,000 - 75,000 (2000 statistics)
 Libyan Americans: 9,000 (2010 Census)
 Algerian Americans: 8,752 (2000 Census)
 Tunisian Americans: 4,735 (2000 Census)

Genetics 
Most of these populations belong to the E1b1b paternal haplogroup, with Berber speakers having among the highest frequencies of this lineage. Additionally, genomic analysis has found that Berber and other Maghreb communities are defined by a shared ancestral component. This Maghrebi element peaks among Tunisian Berbers. It is related to the Coptic component, having diverged from these and other West Eurasian-affiliated components prior to the Holocene people with origins from Morocco, Algeria, Tunisia and Libya.

Culture and language
Most of North Africans in the United States are Muslims, Jews and Catholics (Isleños). Although there is also a small minority of people with the Berber culture that according to the census of 2000, they were 1327 people in the U.S. As well as also Jewish minorities originating mainly from Morocco. Most of the Muslim are Sunnis.

Linguistically, the majority of North Africans in United States speak English, Arabic, Coptic, French (Algerians, Moroccans, and Tunisians), Berber, Italian (Libyans), and Spanish (some Isleños).

While the Arabic language is shared by most North African people – although in their particular dialects such as Moroccan Arabic or Tunisian Arabic, French and Italian are also often used among North Africans from the states that were colonies of France and Italy in the late 19th and early 20th centuries. Berber also is spoken mainly by many Moroccans (in fact, in Morocco, the people who speak Berber is, according various estimates, between 45% and 60% of the population) and Algerians (in Algeria represent between the 25% and the 45% of population) in United States. The majority of the Isleños speak English, but there still some people who speak a Canarian Spanish of the 18th century. The more recent Canarian immigrants; as they are Spanish, they speak Spanish.

Organizations
Although some organizations created by North Africans in the United States are directed to the Muslim community general, there also associations directed specifically to the North African community of United States. This is the case of the Maghreb Association of North America (MANA), an organization created by Moroccan and Algerian Americans in Chicago with the goal of helping new immigrants from North Africa adapt to American life while maintaining the basic principles that consists of Islam, particularly of the Sunni branch. This organization is specifically directed to North African immigrants because they have not been associated closely with the Muslim people of Middle East. 

The Amazigh Cultural Association in America (ACAA) is a non-profit organization established in the New Jersey state. This organization's goal is to promote the Amazigh (Berber) language and culture in the United States. The United Amazigh Algerian (UAAA), a nonreligious association based in the San Francisco bay area, also have a like goal of boosting the Berber culture in North America and beyond. Another Amazigh organization is the Amazigh American Association of Washington, DC. 
 
Many organizations are directed to specific ancestral groups like the Friends of Morocco, the Algerian American Association of Northern California, and the New Sudan-American Hope (NSAH) founded in 1999 by a group of Sudanese from Rochester, Minnesota, to help Sudanese refugees in aspects such as language and skill.

See also
 African Americans
 African immigration to the United States
 Amazigh Cultural Association in America
 Arab Americans
 Berber Americans
 Coptic Americans
 Little Maghreb
 Maghreb Association of North America
 Maghrebi Arabs
 North Africa
 North Africa American Cemetery and Memorial

References

External links 
 North Africa American Cemetery And Memorial

 
 
Multiracial ethnic groups in the United States